Mark Lemar Stewart (born August 16, 1961), known by his stage name Stew, is an American singer-songwriter and playwright from Los Angeles, California, United States.

Career

The Negro Problem
In the early 1990s, he formed a four-piece band called The Negro Problem which in 1995 released a box set collection of singles including an innovative cover of "MacArthur Park" and a multi-part pop operetta entitled "Miss Jones".

Solo career
He later went on to release albums under his own name. His 2000 release Guest Host was named Album of the Year by Entertainment Weekly and his 2002 album, The Naked Dutch Painter and Other Songs, repeated that feat. He toured in support of Love's Arthur Lee in 2002 and in 2003 he was invited to take part in the Lincoln Center's American Songbook series of concerts.

Starting in 2004, he began writing the book, lyrics and music (with Heidi Rodewald) for his semi-autobiographical rock musical Passing Strange, produced with the support of the Sundance Institute and The Public Theater, which won him the Drama Desk Award for Outstanding Lyrics. Also in 2004, he wrote and performed "Gary's Song" for the SpongeBob SquarePants episode "Have You Seen This Snail? (Where's Gary?)", which aired the following year, and is credited with giving him his first broadcast exposure. In 2006, he and Rodewald continued to produce Passing Strange as well as working on a film project with The Sundance Institute. Passing Strange had successful runs at the Berkeley Repertory Theatre in Berkeley, California, in the fall of 2006, and off-Broadway at The Public Theater in New York City during the spring of 2007. It received critical praise from both the New York Times and Variety and opened on Broadway at the Belasco Theatre in February 2008 under the aegis of producer Liz McCann and the Shubert Organization.  The play garnered seven Tony nominations in 2008, with Stew receiving four nominations and winning the award for Best Book.  The play closed in July 2008, with Spike Lee filming the final performances for a feature film which screened at the Sundance Festival in January 2009.

As Stew and The Negro Problem 
Stew and Heidi debuted a new show, "Making It," at St. Ann's Warehouse in Brooklyn in February 2010.

In December 2011, The Repertory Theatre of St. Louis announced that its 2012 new theatre series, Ignite!, would feature a reading of a stage musical adaptation of the graphic novel, Stagger Lee, with a book by the graphic novel's author, Derek McCulloch, and music and lyrics by Stew and Heidi Rodewald.

He is current airing a live show and accompanying album titled Notes from a Native Song, inspired by the writings of James Baldwin, with Heidi Rodewald and members of The Negro Problem.

Personal life 
Stew has taught at Harvard for two years 2020-2021, where he teaches about musical theater.

Discography

With The Negro Problem
Post Minstrel Syndrome (1997)
Joys & Concerns (1999)
Welcome Black (2002)
Blackboot (2003)
Making It (2012)
Total Bent (2018)
Notes of a Native Song (2018)

As Stew
Guest Host (2000)
Sweetboot  (2001)
The Naked Dutch Painter and Other Songs (2002)
Something Deeper Than These Changes (2003)
Gary's Song (Gary come home) (2005)

With The Lullabies
Lullabies' Lullaby (2003)

As producer
At Apogee (2004) by Mr. Smolin
Poison of the Sea (2005) by Patria Jacobs
The Crumbling Empire of White People (2007) by Mr. Smolin

Awards and nominations
 Guest Host, 2000 Best Album of The Year, Entertainment Weekly
 The Naked Dutch Painter and Other Songs, 2002 Best Album of The Year, Entertainment Weekly
 Drama Desk Award for Best Musical – Passing Strange
 Drama Desk Award for Best Lyrics – Passing Strange
 Drama Desk Award for Best Music – Passing Strange
 Tony Award for Best Book – Passing Strange
 Tony Award Nomination for Best Musical – Passing Strange
 Tony Award Nomination for Best Actor in a Musical – Passing Strange
 Tony Award Nomination for Best Original Score (with Heidi Rodewald) – Passing Strange
 Tony Award Nomination for Best Orchestrations – Passing Strange
 Obie Award (with Heidi Rodewald) – Passing Strange

References

External links
Broadway Production of Passing Strange official website
[ allmusic entry for The Negro Problem]
[ allmusic entry for Stew]
Passing Strange official website
Los Angeles Times article on Passing Strange
Stew sings "Black Men Ski" at TED2006
Stew Sez (Stew's blog)
Trouser Press Entry for The Negro Problem
Tony nominations for 'Passing Strange,' Stew on SFGate
Passing Strange wins Tony Award for best book on A+E Interactive
Passing Strange on the Sundance Film Festival website

1961 births
African-American male singer-songwriters
People from Los Angeles
Living people
African-American dramatists and playwrights
21st-century African-American male singers
20th-century African-American male singers
Singer-songwriters from California
Tony Award winners